Albie is a British animated series about a 5-year-old boy with a wild, distorted imagination. Unfortunately, this gets him into trouble with his friends, family and his neighbour, the grouchy Mr. Kidhater-Cox. Albie was created by award-winning children's author Andy Cutbill and was based on his own childhood. Andy also helped develop Rupert Bear, Follow the Magic... for Channel 5. These series can be often seen repeated on the ITV children's digital channel, CITV.

Overview
The concept of Albie involves a small boy who keeps encountering exotic animals in his garden whose sole purpose seem to be to get him into trouble. This includes a herd of Welsh water buffalo on a mission to nick the bath from Albie's house, Geordie elephants obsessed with buns and a couple of Sahara-missing cockney camels living in the sand-pit. Albie's interaction with the animals is left open as to whether the occurrences are real or not.

From a technical point of view, the show is noteworthy as the human characters and backgrounds were 2D, while the animals were all 3D CGI, with the two elements composited together. 3D animation was done by the short-lived but talented CHD department of Cosgrove Hall Films.

Warped, funny, with extraordinary plots, most episodes  end with the innocent Albie getting the blame, and some very angry person shouting "ALBIE!"

Episodes

Series 1 (2002)

Series 2 (2004)

Broadcast history
 UK
 CITV (2000-2001)
 Australia
 ABC TV (2001-2006)
 New Zealand
 TV3
 France
 TF1 (2002)
 Spain
 La 2 (2003-2005)
 Portugal
 Canal Panda

Awards
 Best Children's Series award at the British Animation Awards, 2002
 Pulcinella award (the Canal Grande prize at the Cartoons on the Bay Festival in Positano, Italy for Best European Programme)
 Best Young Writer Category at the B+ Young Talent Awards 2002

Books
 Albie (2 September 2002)
 Albie and the Big Race (31 October 2004) 
 Albie and the Space Rocket (6 March 2006)

These stories were later compiled into The Big Book of Albie (eeleased on 1 January 2011)

References

2000s British animated television series
2000s British children's television series
2002 British television series debuts
2004 British television series endings
Animated television series about children
English-language television shows
ITV children's television shows
Television series by Cosgrove Hall Films